Oxford Village Historic District is a national historic district located at Oxford in Chenango County, New York. The district includes 201 contributing buildings and seven contributing structures. It encompasses the village's historic core and includes commercial, residential, civic, and ecclesiastical buildings.  Among the notable buildings are the First National Bank of Oxford building (1894), James Clarke House building (remodeled 1914), Baptist Church (United Church of Oxford, 1824), and Gerritt Van Wagenen house (1824).  Located within the district are the separately listed Theodore Burr House and US Post Office-Oxford.

It was added to the National Register of Historic Places in 1985.

References

Historic districts on the National Register of Historic Places in New York (state)
Historic districts in Chenango County, New York
National Register of Historic Places in Chenango County, New York